HVMN, previously known as Nootrobox, is an American company that manufactures and sells a ketone ester drink, products supporting a ketogenic diet, and nootropic supplements. The company is headquartered in San Francisco. HVMN stands for "Health Via Modern Nutrition."

History

The company was first founded in 2014 by Geoffrey Woo and Michael Brandt. While forming the company Woo was an Entrepreneur in residence in the Entrepreneur-in-Residence program of Foundation Capital, while Brandt worked as a Google employee, a freelance photographer, and an adjunct professor at the Academy of Art University.

In October 2015, the company announced that Silicon Valley angel investors including Marissa Mayer and Mark Pincus had invested $500,000 in the company. In December 2015, Andreessen Horowitz led a $2 million venture capital round in the company. Chris Dixon, who has experience at companies like Soylent, led the investment for Andreessen Horowitz.

In August 2016, Nootrobox partnered with 7-Eleven locations in San Francisco. In June 2017, Nootrobox changed its name to H.V.M.N., which stands for "Health Via Modern Nutrition".

In 2018, HVMN products affiliated with United States Special Operations Command were tested as part of Operation Tech Warrior hosted at the National Center for Medical Readiness.

Studies and Results
In November 2017, the company's first commissioned clinical trial found that one of its supplements was less effective in many ways than  the caffeine (a cup of coffee) used as the control. The company then asked researchers to change the name of the product to distance it from the analysis. The company, however, linked to the study on their website as of 2018. 

On September 13, 2018, HVMN was the nutrition sponsor for cyclist Vittoria Bussi, who broke the UCI Hour record using HVMN Ketone drinks in the training run up and on the day of the world record.  In the 2019 Tour de France, multiple cycling teams including  and  confirmed use of ketone ester for performance and recovery.

Culture
In 2016 the company instituted a weekly intermittent fasting day for staff.  This was in line with a fad among Silicon Valley companies and workers at that time to use biohacking techniques in the workplace.

References

American companies established in 2014
Companies based in San Francisco
Online food retailers of the United States
2014 establishments in California